When the Sun Goes Down is the third and final studio album by American band  Selena Gomez & the Scene, released on June 28, 2011, by Hollywood Records. The band worked with several artists on this album, including writers and producers from their debut, Kiss & Tell (2009), and their second album, A Year Without Rain (2010), such as Rock Mafia's Tim James and Antonina Armato, as well as Katy Perry, Devrim "DK" Karaoglu, and Toby Gad. New contributors to this album included Britney Spears, Priscilla Renea, Emanuel Kiriakou, Dreamlab and Sandy Vee.

When the Sun Goes Down spawned three singles. The lead single from the album, "Who Says" was released in March 2011, peaking at number 21 in the United States and in the top twenty in Canada and New Zealand. The acoustic pop song also went Platinum in the United States. The second single from the album is "Love You like a Love Song" charted in the top forty in Belgium, Canada, New Zealand and the United States. The third and final single, "Hit the Lights" was released on January 20, 2012, and reached number 11 in Belgium. The album debuted at number four on the Billboard 200 with sales 78,000 copies, surpassing the first week sales of the group's first two albums. The album rose to number three in its second week. As of January 2020, the album sold over 710,000 copies in the United States. This is the final album released by the group before their indefinite hiatus.

Background
In 2009, the band released their debut album, Kiss & Tell, and quickly followed-up with 2010's A Year Without Rain. After the release of the latter Gomez said that she was not in a rush to release another album, but after hearing "Who Says", she decided to begin another release, calling the song "amazing" and crediting it for inspiring her. "Who Says" debuted on radio show On Air with Ryan Seacrest as the first single of the album. On March 18, 2011, in an interview with MTV, Gomez revealed, "the third record is really fun, and there's a song called 'Hit the Lights' that I love, and it's basically about every missed opportunity that you've had," she said. "But it's also a dance track. There's a lot more depth [on this album]". Gomez also revealed British recording artist Pixie Lott and German producer Toby Gad had both penned tracks for the album, while confirming its release for Summer 2011. A few days later, the singer revealed her team and the band "haven't decided [a] title [yet for the album] and we're dealing with the album artwork, 'cause it is very different and I'm growing up. It's a lot more mature". MTV News later confirmed that American recording artist Britney Spears had also written a song for the album titled "Whiplash". On June 1, 2011, the album's name, When the Sun Goes Down, and track listing were revealed through Gomez's official website. After several songs from When the Sun Goes Down started to leak online, Gomez posted several video messages on her YouTube official channel featuring commentaries about each song of the album. When the Sun Goes Down was released on June 28, 2011 by Hollywood Records.

Composition
Musically, When the Sun Goes Down expands on the dance-pop and electropop themes of its predecessor "A Year Without Rain", with a lighter and sassier feel, according to Tim Sendra of AllMusic also incorporating electro-disco music. Tracks like "Hit the Lights" have disco influences, as they pair ballad lyrics with uptempo and midtempo dance music. The album also explores organic instrumentation. Both the first single "Who Says" and the fourth track "We Own the Night" featuring Pixie Lott features more acoustic, indie pop sounds, which was originally intended for Kelly Clarkson's fifth album Stronger. They are the only songs on the album devoid of synthesized instrumentation.

The first track, "Love You Like a Love Song", was written by Antonina Armato, Tim James, Adam Schmalholz and was produced by Rock Mafia and Devrim Karaoglu. Also serving as the album's second single, the song contains deep, whispered vocals and incorporates a eurodisco rhythm and a soft dubstep influence. Gomez described the promotional single "Bang Bang Bang" as fun and cheeky. It is made up of 1980s electro-disco synths and sees Gomez praising her new boyfriend while mocking her ex. The track was also compared to British electropop duo La Roux's 2009 hit "Bulletproof". "Who Says" is an acoustic self-empowerment anthem where the singer extends kindness and sympathy to her critics. Serving as the album's first single, it debuted on the Hot 100 at number twenty-four and peaked at number twenty-one, standing as the group's highest charting single in the U.S., Canada and New Zealand. "We Own the Night" was written by Toby Gad and British electronic soul singer-songwriter Pixie Lott, who is also featured on backing vocals. The track has a largely acoustic, harmonic sound paired with escapist lyrics in the style of Jimmy Buffett. "Hit the Lights" written by Leah Haywood, Daniel James, Tony Nilsson and produced by Dreamlab is a dance song about overcoming anxiety and living in the moment. American pop singer Britney Spears composed the album's sixth track titled "Whiplash". It is an electropop song described as electro glam that is about an intense romance, featuring transportation imagery. The song has gained notability for Britney Spears' involvement in the composition, Gomez' faux-English accent in the spoken word verse before the chorus, and for being one of the band's more mature songs.

The title track features the use of electric guitars and stuttering synthesizers. Selena Gomez stated that "When the Sun Goes Down" held a special meaning for her and her bass player, Joey Clement, because of their collaborative involvement in the track's composition. Gomez commented "I got to rewrite the bridge of it as well. It felt like we got to do that as a band." The eighth track on the album is "My Dilemma", a Kelly Clarkson-esque pop rock song about conflicted feelings towards a potential breakup. "That's More Like It", the following track, is penned by Katy Perry and was inspired by American women of the 1950s and their relegation to domesticity. In the song, Gomez demands that her negligent man does the cooking, cleaning, and housework, commanding him "Make me dinner and bring it to me." "Outlaw" is a bleak cautionary tale and revenge ballad lyrically similar to Carrie Underwood's "Cowboy Casanova" and Lady Gaga's "Monster". The lyrics also make use of Wild West imagery and references to Gomez's home state of Texas, "I'm from the Lone Star state, I'm ready to bring you in." The album's final song "Middle of Nowhere" is a dance-pop ballad that features electropop beats and synthesizers along with bells and chimes. In the song, Gomez laments being left behind by a manipulative ex lover, for whom she made drastic personal changes. The song's bridge is a deep and heavily-breathed spoken-word recitation of the song's chorus, much in the style of Garbage frontwoman Shirley Manson. A Spanish-language version of the lead single "Who Says" titled "Dices" is featured as a bonus track.

Singles
The album's lead single, "Who Says", was co-written and produced by Emanuel Kiriakou, Priscilla Hamilton, and was released on March 14, 2011. The song has been met with generally positive reviews from most music critics, with many praising its theme of self-empowerment and Bill Lamb of About.com even called the band "the most consistent Disney pop hitmaker in recent years." The song proved moderately successful, debuting at number twenty-four and so far peaking at number twenty-one on the Billboard Hot 100 and has gone on to sell over a million copies in the United States, and was certified platinum by RIAA. "Who Says" also reached number seventeen in Canada and fifteen in New Zealand, becoming the band's highest charting single on those countries. The song also managed to peak inside the top fifty in Germany and Ireland and appeared on the main charts in the United Kingdom, Belgium, Australia, Austria, Thailand and Vietnam. On June 17, 2011, "Love You Like a Love Song", the album's official second single was released. Gomez started filming the music video for "Hit the Lights" in September 2011. The video was released in November 2011, the song has currently attained the top thirty chart position in Belgium and debuted on the Canadian Hot 100 at number ninety-three. A remixes EP was released for "Hit the Lights" on January 20, 2012 and it was officially released as the third and final international single on January 20, 2012.

Promotional singles
In preparation for the album's release, the band's record label decided to release two buzz singles. On June 7, 2011, iTunes released two promotional tracks from the album. Beginning with "Bang Bang Bang", which peaked ninety-four in the Billboard Hot 100, and followed by a Spanish version of "Who Says", titled "Dices".

Critical reception

At Metacritic, which assigns a normalised rating out of 100 to reviews from mainstream critics, the album has an average score of 58 out of 100, which indicates "mixed or average reviews" based on six reviews.

Mikael Wood from Entertainment Weekly wrote that "[Gomez] sounds fully invested in tart electro-disco ditties like 'Bang Bang Bang'," and that "top-shelf collaborators don't hurt." Tim Sendra, writing for AllMusic, called the album "an improvement over 2010's A Year Without Rain and "fun" but felt that "she seems to be acting out the songs, more than actually feeling the emotions she's singing about" and that "if she wants to make a real impact, she'll need to dig a little deeper or stake out her own territory."

Jody Rosen from Rolling Stone had a more negative review, writing that "she brings nothing in the way of personality to her songs" and that "Gomez may be the most boring teen-pop star of her generation. She makes Ashley Tisdale seem like Lady Gaga." John Bergstrom of PopMatters opined that the album "smacks of cold calculation" and that "it could have been conceived, designed, written and produced by a computer program, the only human input being those of Gomez's vocals" while adding that "here you have 27 songwriters and eight production teams contributing to a total of 11 songs. Is this an album or "Iron Man 3?" Kitty Empire of The Guardian wrote that "throughout this dance-pop album there's a catch in her throat that suggests an embryonic personality."

Accolades

Commercial performance
When the Sun Goes Down was released on June 28, 2011. In the week of July 4, 2011, it debuted at number four on the Billboard 200 with the band's highest sales week to date, selling 78,000 copies in its first week. The next week the album rose to number three, making it the band's highest charting album. In Canada, the album sold 9,000 copies in its first week, debuting at number two on the Canadian Albums Chart. The album debuted in Spain at number two on the Spanish Albums Chart. The album peaked there for three weeks, during the debut week and the fifth and sixth week on the chart. In Belgium, the album debuted at number twenty-one on the Belgian Albums Chart and jumped to its peak position at number six. The album debuted and peaked at number six in Mexico. The album debuted at number sixteen in Norway and rose to its peak position at number 6 in its eighth week. The album has sold over 710,000 copies in the United States.

Track listing
Credits adapted from the album's liner notes

Notes
 signifies co-producer
 signifies a producer and vocal producer
 signifies a vocal producer
 signifies a language adapter
 signifies an additional producer
 signifies a remixer

Personnel
Credits adapted from the album's liner notes

 Selena Gomez – lead vocals (all tracks), background vocals (track 4)
 Rock Mafia – production, mixing & additional background vocals (tracks 1, 8, 10)
 Toby Gad – production, mixing, programming & instruments (tracks 2, 4)
 Greg Kurstin – production, mixing, engineering, keyboards, bass, guitar & programming (track 6)
 Nigel Lundemo – digital editing (tracks 1, 8, 10), additional vocal editing (track 12)
 Josh Alexander – production, programming, recording & instruments (track 9)
 Espen Lind – production, vocal production, mixing & keyboards (track 11)
 Mark Portmann – language adaptation, recording, vocal production & additional vocal editing (track 12)
 Paul Palmer – mixing (tracks 1, 8, 10)
 Adam Comstock – engineering (tracks 1, 8, 10)
 Steve Hammons – engineering (tracks 1, 8, 10)
 Devrim Karaoglu – co-production (tracks 1, 8, 10)
 Tim Pierce – guitar (tracks 1, 8, 10)
 Tim James – digital editing (tracks 1, 8, 10)
 Brooke Adams – additional background vocals (tracks 1, 8, 10)
 Emanuel Kiriakou – production (tracks 3, 12), instruments (track 3)
 Serban Ghenea – mixing (tracks 3, 5, 12)
 John Hanes – mix engineering (tracks 3, 5, 12)
 Espen Lind – recording, guitar & keyboards (track 11)
 Tim Roberts – mix engineering assistance (tracks 3, 12)
 Pixie Lott – lead vocals & background vocals (track 4)
 Stefan Abingdon – production & mixing (track 7)
 Brian Reeves – mixing & recording (track 7)
 Jon Vella – additional programming (track 8, 10)
 Noel Zancanella – programming & instruments (track 9)
 Carmen Michelle – vocal production & backing vocals (track 11)
 Edgar Cortazar – language adaptation & vocal production (track 12)
 Ross Hogarth – engineering (track 1)
 Priscilla Renea – backing vocals (track 2)
 Meleni Smith – backing vocals (track 2)
 Andrew Goldstein – additional synthesizer (track 3)
 Dreamlab – production (track 5)
 Phil Seaford – engineering assistance (track 5)
 Jesse Shatkin – engineering (track 6)
 Nicole Morier – backing vocals (track 6)
 Lindsey Harper – backing vocals (track 7)
 Jimmy Messer – guitar (track 8)
 Billy Steinberg – production (track 9)
 Phil Tan – mixing (track 9)
 Chris Garcia – digital editing (track 9)
 Scott Roewe – logic and pro tools teching (track 9)
 Damien Lewis – additional engineering assistance (track 9)
 Thomas Sturges – co-production (track 10)
 Espionage – production (track 11)
 Francis Murray – recording (track 11)
 Howard Willing – recording (track 11)
 Carlos Castro – recording (track 12)
 Leyla Hoyle – background vocals (track 12)

 Credits

 Robert Vosgien – mastering
 Jon Lind – A&R
 Cindy Warden – A&R coordination
 Lincoln Wheeler – marketing
 Mandy Teefey – management
 David Lande – legal
 David Snow – creative director
 Jeri Heiden – art direction
 Nick Steinhardt – art direction & design
 Kate Turning – photography
 Steve Jacobi – photo producer

Charts and certifications

Charts

Year-end charts

Certifications

Release history

References

2011 albums
Selena Gomez & the Scene albums
Hollywood Records albums
Albums produced by Dreamlab
Albums produced by Emanuel Kiriakou
Albums produced by Greg Kurstin
Albums produced by Rock Mafia
Albums produced by Toby Gad
Albums recorded at Westlake Recording Studios